José Luis Villagra (born 24 February 1986) is an Argentine football player.

References
 

1986 births
Living people
Argentine footballers
Argentine expatriate footballers
Newell's Old Boys footballers
O'Higgins F.C. footballers
Expatriate footballers in Chile
Association football forwards